The 2016 Asian Men's U20 Volleyball Championship was held in Kaohsiung, Taiwan from 9 to 17 July 2016. The top two teams qualified for the 2017 U21 World Championship.

Pools composition
Teams were seeded in the first two positions of each pool following the Serpentine system according to their final standing of the 2014 edition. AVC reserved the right to seed the hosts as head of Pool A regardless of the final standing of the 2014 edition. All teams not seeded were drawn. Final standing of the 2014 edition are shown in brackets except Hosts who ranked 6th.

Venues
 Kaohsiung Arena, Kaohsiung, Taiwan – Main venue
 Fengshan Gymnasium, Kaohsiung, Taiwan – Sub venue

Pool standing procedure
 Number of matches won
 Match points
 Sets ratio
 Points ratio
 Result of the last match between the tied teams

Match won 3–0 or 3–1: 3 match points for the winner, 0 match points for the loser
Match won 3–2: 2 match points for the winner, 1 match point for the loser

Preliminary round
All times are Taiwan National Standard Time (UTC+08:00).

Pool A

|}

|}

Pool B

|}

|}

Pool C

|}

|}

Pool D

|}

|}

Classification round
All times are Taiwan National Standard Time (UTC+08:00).
The results and the points of the matches between the same teams that were already played during the preliminary round shall be taken into account for the classification round.

Pool E

|}

|}

Pool F

|}

|}

Pool G

|}

|}

Pool H

|}

|}

Final round
All times are Taiwan National Standard Time (UTC+08:00).

13th–16th places

13th–16th semifinals

|}

15th place match

|}

13th place match

|}

9th–12th places

9th–12th semifinals

|}

11th place match

|}

9th place match

|}

Final eight

Quarterfinals

|}

5th–8th semifinals

|}

Semifinals

|}

7th place match

|}

5th place match

|}

3rd place match

|}

Final

|}

Final standing

Awards

Most Valuable Player
 Liu Zhihao
Best Setter
 Javad Karimi
Best Outside Spikers
 Amirhossein Esfandiar
 Yu Yuantai

Best Middle Blockers
 Ali Asghar Mojarad
 Tao Zixuan
Best Opposite Spiker
 Rasoul Aghchehli
Best Libero
 Oh Eun-ryeol

See also
 List of sporting events in Taiwan

References

External links
Official website
Regulations
Squads

Asian Men's U20 Volleyball Championship
Asian
Asian Junior
International volleyball competitions hosted by Taiwan